Lisabeula is an unincorporated community in King County, Washington, United States.

History
A post office called Lisabeula was established in 1892, and remained in operation until 1935. The community's name is an amalgamation of Elisa and Beulah.

References

Unincorporated communities in King County, Washington
Unincorporated communities in Washington (state)